= Thomas Kennett =

U.S. Air Force general

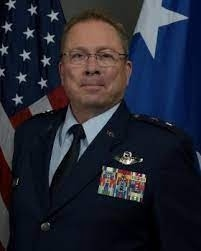
- Official portrait, 2020
- Military career
- Allegiance: United States
- Branch: United States Air Force
- Service years: 1987–2021
- Rank: Major General
- Commands: 164th Operations Group
- Awards: Air Force Distinguished Service Medal; Legion of Merit

Thomas J. Kennett is a retired United States Air Force major general who has served as the Air National Guard Assistant to the commander of Air Mobility Command.

Military offices
Preceded by ???	Air National Guard Assistant to the Commander of the Air Mobility Command; 2019–2021	Succeeded by Laurie M. Farris
